Yuriy Volodymyrovych Hura (born 8 August 1976) is a Ukrainian former professional football midfielder and manager. Hura is better known for coaching UkrAhroKom Holovkivka.

Playing career

Polihraftekhnika Oleksandriya
Hura started out playing in youth clubs of Oleksandriya in Central Ukraine and later joined city's main club Polihraftekhnika.

Kazakhstan
In 2000s he moved to Kazakhstan and for almost a decade disappeared from the Ukrainian football.

Return to Ukraine
In 2008 he returned to his home country playing in amateur competitions and eventually joined the newly created club UkrAhroKom Holovkivka from Oleksandriya suburbs.

Managerial career

UkrAhroKom Holovkivka
At the end of 2010, Hura announced his retirement from playing career and became the head coach of the amateur club UkrAhroKom Holovkivka where he finished his playing career. During his term as head coach of the small club Hura managed to bring them from amateurs to the second professional tier Ukrainian First League.

Oleksandriya
Following completion of the 2013–14 season, UkrAhroKom Holovkivka was merged with PFC Oleksandriya to form Oleksandriya and Hura joined the coaching staff of new club coaching youth reserve. After dismissal of Volodymyr Sharan in May 2021 Hura became the head coach of Oleksandriya.

Honours

Player

Lokomotyv Znamianka
Kirovohrad Oblast Championship: 1993–94

Zhenis Astana
Kazakhstan Premier League: 2001
Kazakhstan Cup: 2000–01

Urengoygasprom Anapa
Krasnodar Krai Cup: 2002
Krasnodar Krai Super Cup: 2002
Krasnodar Krai Championship runner-up: 2002

Fakel Varva
Chernihiv Oblast Cup runner-up: 2003

Kholodnyi Yar Kamyanka
Cherkasy Oblast Cup: 2008
Cherkasy Oblast Championship runner-up: 2008

UkrAhroKom Holovkivka
Kirovohrad Oblast Cup: 2009
Kirovohrad Oblast Championship runner-up: 2009

Manager

UkrAhroKom Holovkivka
Ukrainian Second League runner-up: 2012–13

References

External links
 
 

1976 births
Living people
Ukrainian footballers
Ukrainian expatriate footballers
Ukrainian expatriate sportspeople in Kazakhstan
Expatriate footballers in Kazakhstan
Ukrainian expatriate sportspeople in Russia
Expatriate footballers in Russia
FC Oleksandriya players
FC Enerhiya Yuzhnoukrainsk players
FC Zhenis Astana players
FC Ordabasy players
FC Fakel Varva players
FC Atyrau players
FC Vostok players
FC UkrAhroKom Holovkivka players
Ukrainian First League players
Ukrainian Second League players
Ukrainian Amateur Football Championship players
Kazakhstan Premier League players
Association football midfielders
Ukrainian football managers
FC UkrAhroKom Holovkivka managers
FC Oleksandriya managers
Ukrainian Premier League managers
Ukrainian First League managers
Ukrainian Second League managers